A prism sight or prismatic sight, sometimes also called prism scope or prismatic scope, is a type telescopic sight  which uses a roof prism for its image-erecting system (instead of the series of relay lenses found in traditional telescopic sights). The use of prisms makes it possible to construct a shorter and lighter sight, or with an offset between the eyepiece and objective axes.

Description 
Most prism sights use roof prisms, by the same principle as compact handheld binoculars and spotting scopes. The reticle is etched onto one face of the prism, making it easy to illuminate the reticle from the back of the prism, even when active illumination is turned off. A prism sight is a form of telescopic sight so have similar features and limitations.

Magnification 

Prismatic scopes often have fixed magnification, such as 1× magnification (parity magnification or "non-magnifying"), 2×, 3× or 4x, sometimes 5× or more. The low magnifications make them best suited for shooting at short or medium distances.

There are also prism sights with adjustable magnification, such as the ELCAN Specter DR/TR series.

Reticle 
Like telescopic sights, prism sights have an etched reticle which makes them suitable for shooters with astigmatism, unlike reflex sights or holographic sights which may be near useless for these shooters depending on the severity of the astigmatism. Furthermore, the reticle is often illuminated, but is also visible without illumination. Etched reticles also makes for the possibility to have more advanced reticles, and some prism sights are available with ballistic reticles which can be used for holdover for shooting at varying distances without turning the adjustment knobs.

Diopter 
Prism sights usually have eyepieces with adjustable diopters so that the image can be adjusted for nearsightedness or farsightedness.

Parallax 
Prism sights have a somewhat larger parallax error than red dot sights. Usually, they do not have an adjustable parallax like some telescopic sights.

Eye relief 
Another disadvantage is eye distance. Like telescopic sights, the eye must be within a certain distance from the scope.

History 

Prisms have been used in binoculars since the 1890s. During World War I, the US Army chose to equip the M1903 Springfield repeating rifle for the sniper rifle role by mounting a sight similar to half a binocular, a prismatic sight developed by the Warner & Swasey Company. It was a short and compact sight, and the prisms allowed the objective to be angled to the side so that the 1903 rifle could be loaded with a clip from above. It was also still possible to use the iron sights with the scope mounted. The M1908 version of the scope had 6-times magnification, while the later M1913 version had slightly less magnification at 5.2×. The background for choosing a lower magnification was a larger field of view and improved light transmission. The sight was constructed of steel and brass, was painted black inside for optical performance, and had a relatively high mass of 1020 grams. The eye relief was only 38 mm, so the sight was equipped with a rubber eyepiece shield to prevent the scope from hitting the face during recoil. The reticle was a thin crosshair, as was common for this time period. These sights were also fitted to the Hotchkiss M1909 Benét–Mercié machine gun. Canadian Forces also ordered 500 samples of the 5.2× variant. Moisture on the inside of the lenses was one of several problems in the field, and the scope was known to loosen. In total, approximately 8,000 units of these prismatic sights were produced. The scope sight had the greatest magnification of the First World War, but in return only had a 4.5 degree field of view.

A well-known later example is the fixed-magnification Trijicon ACOG which has been used in combat by the US Marine Corps, US Army and USSOCOM.

In the 2010s, several manufacturers including Trijicon, and Vortex began offering prism sights on the consumer market.

On 2019 October 1, the Chinese QBZ-191 automatic rifle was formally revealed at the 70th Anniversary National Day military parade, and comes standard with a new 3× daylight prismatic sight called QMK152 and QMK-171A.

See also 
 Red dot sight, usually referring to a reflex sight with a red dot, but sometimes a holographic sight or prism sight

References 

Firearm sights